Gene McCarthy may refer to:

 Eugene McCarthy (1916–2005), known as Gene, American politician and poet
 Gene McCarthy (Gaelic footballer) (born 1938), Irish retired Gaelic footballer